WAVE Trust (Worldwide Alternatives to ViolencE) was formed in 1996 and registered as an international educational charity with the Charity Commission for England and Wales under Number 1080189 in 1999. The charity is dedicated to reducing the key root causes of interpersonal violence: child neglect and maltreatment. The method used is a business strategy approach to identify and then tackle these problems at root cause level.

WAVE's fundamental message is that most family violence and maltreatment can be prevented by known, economically viable programs to break damaging family cycles. The research identifies and actively promotes UK adoption of global best practice methods and programs to address violence, e.g. the Nurse-Family Partnership. Research also identifies two early conditions as antidotes to the development of violent personalities: attunement between carers and babies, and the development of empathy in the child.

Activities
WAVE works with police, government departments, academics and other voluntary organizations to improve understanding of the most effective strategies and policies for reducing violence and child maltreatment. The charity also delivers therapeutic programs for violent offenders in prison and after release. In 2008 WAVE cooperated with the Centre for Social Justice and the Smith Institute to write and publish the booklet Early Intervention: Good Parents, Great Kids, Better Citizens. This publication calls on all political parties to unite around a long-term commitment to the policy of Early Intervention.

Concerned about the lack of measurable reductions in child maltreatment in the UK over the previous 70 years, in 2009 WAVE created a '70/30' strategy to reduce child maltreatment and other Adverse Childhood Experiences by 70% by 2030. This strategy is backed by many UK academics, politicians, think tanks and other charities. In 2010, the Liberal Democrats pledged support for WAVE's 70/30 strategy in their pre-election manifesto and in 2018, the Shadow Secretary of State for Health and Social Care stated the Labor party would endorse 70/30. 

556 Members of Parliament and 99% of the Members of the Scottish Parliament have given their backing to the 70/30 Campaign.

Funding
WAVE's funding comes from national and local government bodies, police forces, foundations and trusts, as well as donations from private individuals.

See also

 Attachment theory
 Child abuse
 Child Development Index
 Complex post-traumatic stress disorder
 Domestic violence
 Emotional dysregulation
 International Save the Children Alliance
 Sociology of the family
 Youth studies

References

External links
 

Children's charities based in the United Kingdom
Charities based in London